Seán Mac Falls (born 18 November 1957) is an Irish poet.  Belonging to no group or movement and operating outside of literary fashions, his brand of symbolist poetry can, at first reading, appear difficult. His use of allusion, startling diction and subtle punning display submerged metaphor in his work. The overall effect is a fresh implementation of Imagism.

He has written seven books of poetry and several chapbooks. His first collection of poems, 20 Poems (2001), won praise from Oxford University don John Carey, who compared the poet to W. B. Yeats and from Yale critic Harold Bloom. Several of the poems were Pushcart Prize nominations and were reprinted in eminent American and UK magazines, including Poet Lore, The Lyric (magazine), Agenda, The London Magazine and Stand Magazine

He published a second book, entitled The Blue Falcon, in 2005.  His latest book of verse, is called Garden Theology.

References

Books
20 Poems, Peregrine Press, 2001
 The Blue Falcon, Peregrine Press, 2005
 iKu (Kanshi & Haiku) with paintings by David Coleridge Ryan, Peregrine Press, 2014
 Moon Harvest Under Wood, Peregrine Press, 2016
 Fables and Whim, Peregrine Press, 2018
 Love Songs of Skye, Peregrine Press, 2021
 Garden Theology, Tupelo Press, 2022

External links
 Poet's official website
 Peregrine Press
20 Poems by Seán Mac Falls review at Contemporary Poetry Review

Irish poets
1957 births
Living people